Courtland Township is a civil township of Kent County in the U.S. state of Michigan. The population was 7,678 at the 2010 census, which was an increase from 5,817 at the 2000 census.

History
The first settler in the area was Barton Johnson in 1838.  He settled the community of Evans along a railway station on the early Toledo, Saginaw and Muskegon Railway.  Johnson and Alexander Dean settled the community of Courtland Center in 1839.  It was named after the township, which was organized in the same year.  The community was given its own post office named Courtland from January 30, 1841 to November 10, 1860.  Another post office named Courtland Center was in operation from October 24, 1856 until February 15, 1901.  The community of Sheffield was also a station on the Toledo, Saginaw & Muskegon Railroad that was established in 1888.  Sheffield had its own post office from March 6, 1891 until April 30, 1906.

Geography

Transportation

Airport
 Wells Airport is located in the township.

Major highways
 runs south–north just to the west of the township boundary.
 runs east–west through the center of the township.

Demographics
As of the census of 2000, there were 5,817 people, 1,936 households, and 1,635 families residing in the township. The racial makeup of the township was 98.07% White, 0.19% African American, 0.34% Native American, 0.26% Asian, 0.33% from other races, and 0.81% from two or more races. Hispanic or Latino of any race were 1.29% of the population.

There were 1,936 households, out of which 44.0% had children under the age of 18 living with them, 77.4% were married couples living together, 4.6% had a female householder with no husband present, and 15.5% were non-families. 12.3% of all households were made up of individuals, and 4.6% had someone living alone who was 65 years of age or older.  The average household size was 3.00 and the average family size was 3.26.

In the township the population was spread out, with 30.5% under the age of 18, 6.4% from 18 to 24, 32.2% from 25 to 44, 23.8% from 45 to 64, and 7.2% who were 65 years of age or older.  The median age was 36 years. For every 100 females, there were 105.5 males.  For every 100 females age 18 and over, there were 103.2 males.

The median income for a household in the township was $64,430, and the median income for a family was $69,306. Males had a median income of $50,392 versus $29,744 for females. The per capita income for the township was $26,254.  About 2.0% of families and 2.4% of the population were below the poverty line, including 2.0% of those under age 18 and 12.0% of those age 65 or over.

Education
Courtland Township is served by two different public school districts.  The northern portion of the township is served by Cedar Springs Public Schools, while the southern portion is served by Rockford Public Schools.

References

Sources

External links
Courthland Township official website

Townships in Michigan
Townships in Kent County, Michigan
Grand Rapids metropolitan area
1839 establishments in Michigan
Populated places established in 1839